V. K. Govindan Nair (4 February 1903 – 15 October 1977) was a Malayalam poet from Kerala, India. He received the Kerala Sahitya Akademi Award in 1965 for the collection Avil Pothi.

Biography
He was born 1903 in Thrikkadiri near Ottappalam, a part of the present day Palghat district. After completing higher education from Trichur and Tiruchirappalli, he worked in the Madras Government Press as a clerk. He published his first work Avil Pothi at the age of 60, in 1964. A collection of poems based on the puranic story of Sri Krishna and Kuchela, it received the Kerala Sahitya Akademi Award in 1965. His other poetry collections are V. K. Govindan Nairude Krithikal and Muthukal.

Awards
 1965: Kerala Sahitya Akademi Award for Avil Pothi
 1975: Odakkuzhal Award for V. K. Govindan Nairude Krithikal

References

1903 births
1977 deaths
Malayali people
Writers from Palakkad
Poets from Kerala
Malayalam-language writers
Malayalam poets
Recipients of the Kerala Sahitya Akademi Award
20th-century Indian poets
Indian male poets
20th-century Indian male writers